Red Cloud (1822–1909) was a war leader of the Oglala Lakota.

Red Cloud, Redcloud or RedCloud may also refer to:

People
Mitchell Red Cloud, Jr. (1924–1950), Native American United States Army corporal and Medal of Honor recipient
Oliver Red Cloud (1919–2013), chief of the Oglala Sioux
Elwood Towner, Native American attorney and Nazi sympathizer who performed anti-semitic speeches in the 1930s under the title Chief Red Cloud
Red Cloud (rapper) (born 1978), American Christian hip hop musician

Other uses
Camp Red Cloud, a U.S. Army post in South Korea named after CPL Red Cloud
Jake Red Cloud, a Red Cloud Comics superhero
Red Cloud: Deliverance, movie based on comic book character Jake Red Cloud
Red Cloud, Nebraska, a town in the United States
Red Cloud Indians, minor league baseball teams from Red Cloud, Nebraska
Redcloud Peak, mountain peak in U.S. state of Colorado
USNS Red Cloud (T-AKR-313), a U.S. Navy vessel named after CPL Red Cloud

See also
Red Cloud Agency, Indian agency from 1871 to 1878
Red Cloud High School (disambiguation)
Red Cloud Indian School, private Roman Catholic school in South Dakota established in 1888
Red Cloud United States Post Office, historic site in Red Cloud, Nebraska
Red Cloud's War, armed conflict in Wyoming and Montana territories from 1866 to 1868
Red Thunder Cloud (1919–1996), the last native speaker of Catawba language
Landscape with a Red Cloud, 1913 painting by Konrad Mägi
Under the Red Cloud, studio album by Finnish metal band Amorphis